An Ausbeutemünze (pron. "ows-boy-ter-moonzer") lit. "salvage coin"), also often called an Ausbeutethaler  because it was so common, is an historical European coin minted from metal extracted from the ore of a particular mine. By far the most common of such coins were made of silver.

These coins were normal legal tender, but differed from the usual circulation coins because they had special images stamped on them and were often circulated at certain anniversaries. They were made by mines, for example, in the Harz Mountains.

Variants 
Not only were Thalers made in this fashion, but also part-Thalers, Ducats Lösers and other coins.

References

External links 

 Illustration of the last Saxon yield thaler from 1871
 www.schatzsucher.de: Harz yield coins
 www.moneymuseum.ch: Coin names that refer to a special occasion
 www.germanycash.de: Profit taler

Silver coins
Coins of the Holy Roman Empire
Harz
Ore Mountains
Mining